D' Boys (pronounced as The Boys) was a Yugoslav synth-pop/pop rock band formed in Belgrade in 1982.

Originally formed as a duo consisting of Peđa D'Boy (real name Predrag Jovanović, vocals and guitar, formerly of German band Jane) and Miroslav "Miško" Mihajlovski (percussion), D' Boys initially performed minimalist synth-pop, with campy lyrics dealing with nightlife, parties and girls. After the lineup included guitarist Goran Vejvoda and bass guitarist Miško Plavi (real name Milivoje Petrović), D' Boys, while keeping their stylistic orientation, moved towards more rock-oriented sound. The band released their debut album Ajd' se zezamo in 1983, gaining notable mainstream popularity. After the release of their second album, Muvanje, in 1984, Mihajovski left the band, and the rest of the lineup continued performing as Peđa D' Boy Band, releasing two albums before disbanding in 1986.

Biography

1982–1985
The band was formed in 1982, initially as a duo consisting of Peđa D'Boy (real name Predrag Jovanović, vocals, guitar) and Miško Mihajlovski, percussion, rhythm machine programming). During the 1960s Jovanović was a vocalist for the band Lutalice (The Wanderers), appeared in Živojin Pavlović's film When I Am Dead and Gone, performed in cafes in France and spent some time on Goa beaches in India, performing with jazz and rock musicians from all over the world. During the 1970s he owned a boutique of leather clothes at Ibiza and was a vocalist for the German progressive/krautrock band Jane. With Jane he recorded their 1980 self-titled album, containing the hit "Love Your Life". Mihajlovski was previously a member of the new wave/art rock band Kozmetika and was one of the artists involved in the work of the pop culture magazine Izgled. Upon his 1982 return to Belgrade, Jovanović decided to start performing. After a jam session, held in Belgrade's Students' Cultural Centre during the art exhibition of the comic book artist Igor Kordej, Jovanović and Mihajlovski decided to start collaborating. Initially, their joint act was known as Peđa i Miško (Peđa and Miško), and later Oksižen (Oxygen, after Peđa D'Boy's dyed hair), until they finally adopted the name D' Boys, suggested by the host of a popular music TV-show Hit meseca (Hit of the Month) Dubravka Marković and her then-boyfriend Srđan "Gile" Gojković of Električni Orgazam.

The band initially performed minimalist music-influenced songs about parties and girls, such as their debut 7-inch single with the songs "Mi smo D' Boys" ("We Are D' Boys") and "Plave oči, crna ljubav" ("Blue Eyes, Dark Love"). The single led to them being booked as a support act at concerts of some prominent Yugoslav groups at the time such as Film, Boa and Aerodrom. During 1982 the duo attracted the attention of the audience and the press with their frequent club performances in Belgrade, their image and flirting with gay aesthetics. However, they were frequently lampooned by the music critics because of their campy and frivolous lyrics dealing with nightlife, parties and girls, flavoured with typical Belgrade humorous slang. In the autumn of 1982, two new musicians joined the band: guitarist Goran Vejvoda and multi-instrumentalist Milivoje "Miško" Petrović, also known as Miško Plavi (Miško the Blonde), who was previously a member of the new wave band VIA Talas and in D' Boys initially played bass guitar. With the new lineup, the band kept their stylistic orientation, at the same time moving towards more rock-oriented sound. Having two members nicknamed Miško often led to confusion among their fans and in the media. Soon, Goran Vejvoda left, so Miško Plavi switched to guitar, while Dragan "Gagi" Ilić, who previously worked with singer Slađana Milošević, became the new bass player.

The band released their debut album Ajd' se zezamo (Let's Fool Around) in the spring of 1983. The album was recorded in the Tetrapak studio in Split and produced by Željko Brodarić "Jappa", with the former Miss Yugoslavia Ana Sasso on backing vocals. The album cover was designed by Igor Kordej. Beside "Mi smo D' Boys", the album featured an English language version of the song, entitled "We Are D' Boys". The band promoted the album with a concert in Atelje 212 theatre in Belgrade.

During the spring of 1984, D' Boys released their second album, Muvanje (Hitting On), produced by Oliver Mandić and featuring members of the hard rock band Generacija 5 Dragan Jovanović (guitar) and Dragoljub Ilić (keyboards, arrangements, rhythm machine programming) as guests. The album featured a cover of Roy Orbison song "Oh, Pretty Woman" entitled "Lepe žene" ("Pretty Women"), a cover of old town music song "Što (Ima dana)" ("Why (There Are Days)"), and the track "Jugoslovenka" ("Yugoslav Girl"), which would soon go on to become the band's biggest hit. After the album release, two new members were added to the lineup: drummer Zoran "Cole" Miljuš, and guitarist Jean-Jacques Roscam, a Belgian of Zaire origin. During the summer of 1984, the group performed in Greece. The band had their last performance in the discotheque Amnezia in Salonica. After their returned to Yugoslavia, Mihajlovski left the band and started performing as Miško D' Boys, while the remainder of the group continued as Peđa D'Boy Band.

Post breakup: Peđa D'Boy Band and other works by former members
In 1985 Peđa D'Boy Band released the album Avantura (Adventure), produced by Peđa D'Boy and Boban Petrović. The video recorded for the song "Visibabe, ljubičice" ("Snowdrops, Violets") was banned from Yugoslav television due to its erotic imagery. In 1985 Peđa D'Boy took part in YU Rock Misija, the Yugoslav contribution to Live Aid, and Peđa D'Boy Band performed on the corresponding charity concert, held on Red Star Stadium on 15 June 1985. During the same year, Peđa D'Boy represented Yugoslavia at the Song of Mediterranean festival in Palermo, winning the second place with "Jugoslovenka". Soon after, Jean-Jacques Roscam left the band to join Galija, while Dragan Ilić died of complications caused by gastric ulcer operation. In 1986 Peđa D'Boy Band released the album Laku noć ti, mala (Goodnight, Baby), produced by Kornelije Kovač, who also composed four songs on the album. Beside Peđa D' Boy, Miško Plavi and Zoran Miljuš, the album featured Kornelije Kovač and Boban Petrović on keyboards, Dragan Jovanović and Srđan Miodragović on guitar and Ivan Švager on saxophone. The song "Šta da radim s rukama" ("What Should I Do with My Hands") featured guest appearance by actor Ratko Tankosić. After the album release, the band went on a short tour across Greece with Riblja Čorba and Galija, after which they ended their activity.

Peđa D'Boy performed as a solo artist for a short time. On the 1986 MESAM festival he performed the song "Mrzim da spavam sam" ("I Hate Sleeping Alone"), and at the end of the year he moved back to France. He made a brief appearance in Belgrade in 1992, to perform at a retro concert of Yugoslav pop and rock music held in Belgrade Youth Center. In 1997, in London, he recorded some new material, produced by Mark Evans, including a remix of "Jugoslovenka". The material was published on an EP. He returned to Serbia in 2006, having his comeback appearance as a guest at Delča i Sklekovi concert in Belgrade Youth Center. He continued to perform and record as a solo artist, backed by the group Polyester Shock.

After Peđa D' Boy Band disbanded, Miško Plavi and Zoran Miljuš formed the short-lived group Fantazija (Fantasy) with guitarist Vojislav Bešić "Beške" (formerly of Bezobrazno Zeleno), vocalist Igor Pervić (formerly of Duh Nibor) and keyboardist Goran Marić, the group disbanding after only a year. After that, Miško Plavi moved to Piloti, where he played bass guitar. After Piloti, he moved to Ekatarina Velika and evetually formed his Miško Plavi Band. At the beginnig of the 2000s he moved to Japan and started performing as an accordionist, cooperating with a number of Japanese musicians and holding a large number of concerts across the world.

After leaving D' Boys, Mihajlovski performed for some time with guitarist Nebojša, who simultaneously worked with singer Seid Memić "Vajta". In 1987 Mihajlovski started performing with singer Bebi Dol. They performed in clubs across Yugoslavia until the outbreak of the Yugoslav Wars. He died on 2 December 2011, aged 63.

In 2018 the first official D' Boys compilation, entitled Mi smo D' Boys: The Very Best Of, was released through Take It Or Leave It Records.

Legacy
Serbian girl group Models covered the song "Jugoslovenka" on their 1997 album Made in Belgrade. Serbian and Yugoslav rock singer Viktorija recorded a cover of "Jugoslovenka" on her 2000 live album Nostalgija (Nostalgia). The song appeared in Srđan Dragojević's 1996 film Pretty Village, Pretty Flame. 

In 2006, the song "Mi smo D' Boys" was ranked No. 100 on the B92 Top 100 Domestic Songs list.

Discography

Studio albums
 Ajd' se zezamo (1983)
 Muvanje (1984)

Compilation albums
Mi smo D' Boys: The Very Best Of (2018)

Singles
 "Mi smo D' Boys" / "Crne oči, plava ljubav" (1983)
 "Jugoslovenka" / "Florida (Mala moja ne plači)" (1984)

References

Serbian synthpop groups
Serbian pop rock music groups
Yugoslav rock music groups
Yugoslav synthpop groups
Musical groups from Belgrade
Musical groups established in 1982
Musical groups disestablished in 1985
1982 establishments in Yugoslavia